The men's Greco-Roman 66 kilograms is a competition featured at the 2003 World Wrestling Championships, and was held at the Palais des Sports Robert Oubron in Créteil, France from 2 to 4 October 2003.

Medalists

Results
Legend
R — Retired

Preliminary round

Pool 1

Pool 2

Pool 3

Pool 4

Pool 5

Pool 6

Pool 7

Pool 8

Pool 9

Pool 10

Pool 11

Pool 12

 Nikolay Monov was disqualified at the end of the preliminary round for being found ineligible.

Pool 13

Pool 14

Pool 15

Knockout round

References

Men's Greco-Roman 66 kg